Hizb-i Islami Afghanistan (Islamic Party of Afghanistan) is a title claimed at various point by several Afghan political and militant groups.  The groups are commonly referred to by the name of their leader, though the group itself may claim the term "Afghanistan."

Hezb-e Islami Gulbuddin
Hezb-e Islami Khalis
Hezb-e-Islami Khalid Farooqi

See also 
 Hezbi Islami

Jihadist groups in Afghanistan